María Elena "Maluca" Llamas (born 4 August 1962) is a Mexican former professional tennis player. She is the daughter of Davis Cup player Mario Llamas.

Llamas was a bronze medalist in the women's singles event at the 1979 Pan American Games in San Juan.

Between 1979 and 1989, she appeared in eight Federation Cup ties for Mexico. During this time she also competed in ITF satellite tournaments, mostly local, to reach career rankings of 421 in singles and 207 in doubles.

ITF finals

Singles (0–1)

Doubles (3–2)

References

External links
 
 
 

1962 births
Living people
Mexican female tennis players
Pan American Games medalists in tennis
Pan American Games bronze medalists for Mexico
Tennis players at the 1979 Pan American Games
Central American and Caribbean Games medalists in tennis
Central American and Caribbean Games silver medalists for Mexico
Medalists at the 1979 Pan American Games
20th-century Mexican women